Buildings can appear to be twisted by design, where the twisting (torsion, helix, etc.) is structural rather than merely an ornamental detail. The Council on Tall Buildings and Urban Habitat defines a twisting building as one that progressively rotates its floor plates or its façade as it gains height. There are 15 spiralled skyscrapers, and 13 more are under construction.

Turning Torso, in Malmö, Sweden is regarded as the first twisted tower or building. It was designed by Santiago Calatrava and was completed in 2005. When completed, Diamond Tower will be the only building to twist a full 360 degrees along its height. F&F Tower, in Panama City, holds the record for the tightest twist, that is, the highest average rotation per floor, at 5.943 degrees across each of its 53 floors; and as of 2017, it is the completed building with the highest total rotation, with 315 degrees.

List of tallest twisted buildings
The following list includes completed or topped-out buildings sorted by height. Buildings under construction are shaded in grey.

See also
List of twisted spires

References